Kosta Dražić (born 21 April 1998) is a Serbian football forward who plays for Bečej.

References

External links
 

1998 births
Living people
Sportspeople from Subotica
Association football forwards
Serbian footballers
FK Brodarac players
OFK Bečej 1918 players
FK Budućnost Valjevo players
FK Mačva Šabac players
FK Loznica players
FK Kabel players
FK Zvijezda 09 players
Serbian First League players
First League of the Republika Srpska players
Serbian expatriate footballers
Expatriate footballers in Bosnia and Herzegovina
Serbian expatriate sportspeople in Bosnia and Herzegovina